K. Ramasubbu (born 30 May 1911) was an Indian politician who was a member of the Tamil Nadu Legislative Assembly. 

Ramasubbu was born in Palayamkottai, Tirunelveli district on 30 May 1911. He had school education at St. Xavier's Higher Secondary School, Palayamkottai. He studied at The Madurai Diraviyam Thayumanavar Hindu College in Tirunelveli Pettai and the Presidency College in Chennai. He was also the district functionary of the Indian National Congress Party and held several key positions in the Tirunelveli district administration. He contested and won assembly elections of Kadampur Assembly constituency in the year 1957.

References

1911 births
Possibly living people
Indian National Congress politicians from Tamil Nadu
Madras MLAs 1957–1962
People from Tirunelveli district
Presidency College, Chennai alumni